The Sacred Heart Girls High School is a day and boarding school for girls ages 4–18 years located in the Bali District of New Taipei City, Taiwan. It was founded in 1960 and is a member of the Schools of the Sacred Heart network of private Catholic schools.

See also
 Education in Taiwan

References

External links 
 Official website
 Official website (English version)

Educational institutions established in 1960
High schools in Taiwan
Schools in Taipei
Girls' schools in Taiwan
Boarding schools in Taiwan
1960 establishments in Taiwan